John Ross (13 November 1931 – 1 November 2022) was a Canadian middle-distance runner. He competed in the men's 800 metres at the 1952 Summer Olympics.

References

1931 births
2022 deaths
Athletes (track and field) at the 1952 Summer Olympics
Canadian male middle-distance runners
Olympic track and field athletes of Canada
Sportspeople from Oakville, Ontario